De plus belle is a 2017 French film directed by Anne-Gaëlle Daval. A romantic comedy starring Florence Foresti and Mathieu Kassovitz, it tells the story of a breast cancer survivor's efforts to rebuild her life. It received mixed reviews from critics.

Summary
Lucie Larcher, a breast cancer survivor and single mother, learns how to rebuild her life. She meets Clovis, her new lover, in a nightclub, and takes dancing lessons with her teacher Dalida. She brings up her daughter and takes constructive criticisms from her mother.

Cast
Florence Foresti as Lucie Larchet
Mathieu Kassovitz as Clovis
Nicole Garcia as Dalila
Jonathan Cohen as Frédéric
Olivia Bonamy as Manon
Josée Drevon as Yvonne 
Jeanne Astier as Hortense
Norbert Ferrer as Ben
Perrette Souplex as Salomé 
Sabine Pakora as Sabine

Reception
The film received mixed reviews from critics. On review aggregator website Rotten Tomatoes, the film holds an approval rating of 88% based on 8 reviews, and an average rating of 5.33/10.

In a review for Le Monde, Thomas Sotinel suggested the film was conventional for French romantic comedies, with an expected happy ending. Le Parisien praised Kassovitz and Foresti's acting, calling Foresti's "magical". They concluded, "everything is strong, everything is sharp, everything is intense" in this film.

Reviewing it for L'Express, Laurent Dijan said the film was slow-paced and embarrassing. Nevertheless, he praised Jonathan Cohen's acting. While Sylvestre Picard of Premiere was similarly laudatory of Cohen's acting, he deplored the profusion of sub-themes in the script.

References

External links
 

2017 films
2010s French-language films
Films about cancer
French romantic comedy films
2017 romantic comedy films
Films set in Lyon
Films shot in Lyon
2010s French films